Barbara Murphy may refer to:

 Barbara Murphy (politician), American politician
 Barbara Murphy (immunologist) (1964–2021), Irish nephrologist